Tao or Dao is the natural order of the universe, whose character one's intuition must discern to realize the potential for individual wisdom, as conceived in the context of East Asian philosophy, East Asian religions, or any other philosophy or religion that aligns to this principle. This intuitive knowing of life cannot be grasped as a concept. Rather, it is known through actual living experience of one's everyday being. Its name, Tao or Dao , came from Chinese, where it signifies the way, path, route, road, or sometimes more loosely doctrine, principle, or holistic belief. 

Laozi in the Tao Te Ching explains that the Tao is not a name for a thing, but the underlying natural order of the Universe whose ultimate essence is difficult to circumscribe because it is non-conceptual yet evident in one's being of aliveness. The Tao is "eternally nameless" and should be distinguished from the countless named things that are considered to be its manifestations, the reality of life before its descriptions of it.

The Tao lends its name to the religious tradition and philosophical tradition that are both referred to in English with the single term Taoism.

Description and uses of the concept 

The word "Tao" has a variety of meanings in both ancient and modern Chinese language. Aside from its purely prosaic use meaning road, channel, path, principle, or similar, the word has acquired a variety of differing and often confusing metaphorical, philosophical, and religious uses. In most belief systems, the word is used symbolically in its sense of "way" as the right or proper way of existence, or in the context of ongoing practices of attainment or of the full coming into being, or the state of enlightenment or spiritual perfection that is the outcome of such practices.

Some scholars make sharp distinctions between the moral or ethical usage of the word "Tao" that is prominent in Confucianism and religious Taoism and the more metaphysical usage of the term used in philosophical Taoism and most forms of Mahayana Buddhism; others maintain that these are not separate usages or meanings, seeing them as mutually inclusive and compatible approaches to defining the principle. The original use of the term was as a form of praxis rather than theory—a term used as a convention to refer to something that otherwise cannot be discussed in words—and early writings such as the Tao Te Ching and the I Ching make pains to distinguish between conceptions of the Tao (sometimes referred to as "named Tao") and the Tao itself (the "unnamed Tao"), which cannot be expressed or understood in language. Liu Da asserts that the Tao is properly understood as an experiential and evolving concept and that there are not only cultural and religious differences in the interpretation of the Tao but personal differences that reflect the character of individual practitioners.

The Tao can be roughly thought of as the flow of the Universe or as some essence or pattern behind the natural world that keeps the Universe balanced and ordered. It is related to the idea of qi, the essential energy of action and existence. The Tao is a non-dualistic principle—it is the greater whole from which all the individual elements of the Universe derive. Keller considers it similar to the negative theology of Western scholars, but the Tao is rarely an object of direct worship, being treated more like the Hindu concepts of karma, dharma, or Ṛta than as a divine object. The Tao is more commonly expressed in the relationship between wu (void or emptiness, in the sense of wuji) and yinyang (the natural, dynamic balance between opposites), leading to its central principle of wu wei (inaction or inexertion).

The Tao is usually described in terms of elements of nature, and in particular as similar to water. Like water it is undifferentiated, endlessly self-replenishing, soft and quiet but immensely powerful, and impassively generous. Much of Taoist philosophy centers on the cyclical continuity of the natural world and its contrast to the linear, goal-oriented actions of human beings.

In all its uses, the Tao is considered to have ineffable qualities that prevent it from being defined or expressed in words. It can, however, be known or experienced, and its principles (which can be discerned by observing Nature) can be followed or practiced. Much of East Asian philosophical writing focuses on the value of adhering to the principles of the Tao and the various consequences of failing to do so.

The Tao was shared with Confucianism, Chán and Zen Buddhism, and more broadly throughout East Asian philosophy and religion in general. In Taoism, Chinese Buddhism, and Confucianism, the object of spiritual practice is to "become one with the Tao" (Tao Te Ching) or to harmonize one's will with Nature (cf. Stoicism) to achieve "effortless action" (wu wei). This involves meditative and moral practices. Important in this respect is the Taoist concept of De (virtue). In Confucianism and religious forms of Taoism, these are often explicitly moral/ethical arguments about proper behavior, while Buddhism and more philosophical forms of Taoism usually refer to the natural and mercurial outcomes of action (comparable to karma). The Tao is intrinsically related to the concepts yin and yang (pinyin: yīnyáng), where every action creates counter-actions as unavoidable movements within manifestations of the Tao, and proper practice variously involves accepting, conforming to, or working with these natural developments.

De

De ( "power; virtue; integrity") is the term generally used to refer to proper adherence to the Tao; De is the active living or cultivation of the way. Particular things (things with names) that manifest from the Tao have their own inner nature that they follow in accordance with the Tao, and the following of this inner nature is De. Wuwei (Pinyin: wúwéi) or "naturalness" is contingent on understanding and conforming to this inner nature, which is interpreted variously from a personal, individual nature to a more generalized notion of human nature within the greater Universe.

Historically, the concept of De differed significantly between Taoists and Confucianists. Confucianism was largely a moral system emphasizing the values of humaneness, righteousness, and filial duty, and so conceived De in terms of obedience to rigorously defined and codified social rules. Taoists took a broader, more naturalistic/metaphysical view on the relationship between humankind and the Universe and considered social rules to be at best a derivative reflection of the natural and spontaneous interactions between people and at worst calcified structure that inhibited naturalness and created conflict. This led to some philosophical and political conflicts between Taoists and Confucians. Several sections of the works attributed to Chuang Tzu are dedicated to critiques of the failures of Confucianism.

Religious, philosophical, and cultural interpretations

Taoist interpretations

[Tao] means a road, path, way; and hence, the way in which one does something; method, doctrine, principle. The Way of Heaven, for example, is ruthless; when autumn comes 'no leaf is spared because of its beauty, no flower because of its fragrance'. The Way of Man means, among other things, procreation; and eunuchs are said to be 'far from the Way of Man'. Chu Tao is 'the way to be a monarch', i.e. the art of ruling. Each school of philosophy has its tao, its doctrine of the way in which life should be ordered. Finally in a particular school of philosophy whose followers came to be called Taoists, tao meant 'the way the universe works'; and ultimately something very like God, in the more abstract and philosophical sense of that term.

The Tao is what gives Taoism its English name, in both its philosophical and religious forms. The Tao is the fundamental and central concept of these schools of thought. Taoism perceives the Tao as a natural order underlying the substance and activity of the Universe. Language and the "naming" of the Tao is regarded negatively in Taoism; the Tao fundamentally exists and operates outside the realm of differentiation and linguistic constraints.

Diversity of views

There is no single orthodox Taoist view of the Tao. All forms of Taoism center around Tao and De, but there is a broad variety of distinct interpretations among sects and even individuals in the same sect. Despite this diversity, there are some clear, common patterns and trends in Taoism and its branches.

The diversity of Taoist interpretations of the Tao can be seen across four texts representative of major streams of thought in Taoism. All four texts are used in modern Taoism with varying acceptance and emphasis among sects. The Tao Te Ching is the oldest text and representative of a speculative and philosophical approach to the Tao. The Tao T'i Lun is an eighth century exegesis of the Tao Te Ching, written from a well-educated and religious viewpoint that represents the traditional, scholarly perspective. The devotional perspective of the Tao is expressed in the Qingjing Jing, a liturgical text that was originally composed during the Han dynasty and is used as a hymnal in religious Taoism, especially among eremites. The Zhuangzi (also spelled Chuang Tzu) uses literary devices such as tales, allegories, and narratives to relate the Tao to the reader, illustrating a metaphorical method of viewing and expressing the Tao.

The forms and variations of religious Taoism are incredibly diverse. They integrate a broad spectrum of academic, ritualistic, supernatural, devotional, literary, and folk practices with a multitude of results. Buddhism and Confucianism particularly affected the way many sects of Taoism framed, approached, and perceived the Tao. The multitudinous branches of religious Taoism accordingly regard the Tao, and interpret writings about it, in innumerable ways. Thus, outside of a few broad similarities, it is difficult to provide an accurate yet clear summary of their interpretation of the Tao.

A central tenet in most varieties of religious Taoism is that the Tao is ever-present, but must be manifested, cultivated, and/or perfected in order to be realized. It is the source of the Universe, and the seed of its primordial purity resides in all things. The manifestation of the Tao is De, which rectifies and invigorates the world with the Tao's radiance.

Alternatively, philosophical Taoism regards the Tao as a non-religious concept; it is not a deity to be worshiped, nor is it a mystical Absolute in the religious sense of the Hindu Brahman. Joseph Wu remarked of this conception of the Tao, "Dao is not religiously available; nor is it even religiously relevant." The writings of Lao Tzu and Chang Tzu are tinged with esoteric tones and approach humanism and naturalism as paradoxes. In contrast to the esotericism typically found in religious systems, the Tao is not transcendent to the self, nor is mystical attainment an escape from the world in philosophical Taoism. The self steeped in the Tao is the self grounded in its place within the natural Universe. A person dwelling within the Tao excels in themselves and their activities.

However, this distinction is complicated by hermeneutic (interpretive) difficulties in the categorization of Taoist schools, sects, and movements.

Confucian interpretations

The Dao, or Way, of Confucius can be said to be "Truth". Confucianism regards the Way, or Truth, as concordant with a particular approach to life, politics, and tradition. It is held as equally necessary and well regarded as De (virtue) and ren (humanity). Confucius presents a humanistic "Dao". He only rarely speaks of the t'ien Dao (Way of Heaven). An influential early Confucian, Hsiin Tzu, explicitly noted this contrast. Though he acknowledged the existence and celestial importance of the Way of Heaven, he insisted that the Dao principally concerns human affairs.

As a formal religious concept in Confucianism, Dao is the Absolute toward which the faithful move. In Zhongyong (The Doctrine of the Mean), harmony with the Absolute is the equivalent to integrity and sincerity. The Great Learning expands on this concept explaining that the Way illuminates virtue, improves the people, and resides within the purest morality. During the Tang dynasty, Han Yu further formalized and defined Confucian beliefs as an apologetic response to Buddhism. He emphasized the ethics of the Way. He explicitly paired "Dao" and "De", focusing on humane nature and righteousness. He also framed and elaborated on a dàotǒng (tradition of the Way) in order to reject the traditions of Buddhism.

Buddhist interpretations

Buddhism first started to spread in China during the first century AD and was experiencing a golden age of growth and maturation by the fourth century AD. Hundreds of collections of Pali and Sanskrit texts were translated into Chinese by Buddhist monks within a short period of time. Dhyana was translated as ch'an (and later as zen), giving Zen Buddhism its name. The use of Chinese concepts, such as Dao, that were close to Buddhist ideas and terms helped spread the religion and make it more amenable to the Chinese people. However, the differences between the Sanskrit and Chinese terminology led to some initial misunderstandings and the eventual development of East Asian Buddhism as a distinct entity. As part of this process, many Chinese words introduced their rich semantic and philosophical associations into Buddhism, including the use of 'Dao' for central concepts and tenets of Buddhism.

Pai-chang Huai-hai told a student who was grappling with difficult portions of suttas, "Take up words in order to manifest meaning and you'll obtain 'meaning'. Cut off words and meaning is emptiness. Emptiness is the Dao. The Dao is cutting off words and speech." Ch'an (Zen) Buddhists regard the Dao as synonymous with both the Buddhist Path (marga) and the results of it; the Eightfold Path and Buddhist enlightenment (satori). Pai-chang's statement plays upon this usage in the context of the fluid and varied Chinese usage of 'Dao'. Words and meanings are used to refer to rituals and practices. The 'emptiness' refers to the Buddhist concept of sunyata. Finding the Dao and Buddha-nature is not simply a matter of formulations, but an active response to the Four Noble Truths that cannot be fully expressed or conveyed in words and concrete associations. The use of 'Dao' in this context refers to the literal 'way' of Buddhism, the return to the universal source, dharma, proper meditation, and nirvana, among other associations. 'Dao' is commonly used in this fashion by Chinese Buddhists, heavy with associations and nuanced meanings.

Neo-Confucian interpretations

During the Song dynasty, Neo-Confucians regarded Dao as the purest thing-in-itself. Shao Yong regarded the Dao as the origin of heaven, earth, and everything within them. In contrast, Zhang Zai presented a vitalistic Dao that was the fundamental component or effect of ch'i, the motive energy behind life and the world. A number of later scholars adopted this interpretation, such as Tai Chen during the Qing Dynasty.

Zhu Xi, Cheng Ho, and Cheng Yi perceived the Dao in the context of li (Principle) and t'ien li (the Principle of Heaven). Cheng Hao regarded the fundamental matter of li, and thus Dao, to be humaneness. Developing compassion, altruism, and other humane virtues is following of the Way. Cheng Yi followed this interpretation, elaborating on this perspective of Dao through teachings about yin-yang interactions, the cultivation and preservation of life; and the axiom of a morally just universe.

In total, the Dao is equated with the Absolute. Wang Fuzhi expressed the Dao as the tai chi, The Great Ultimate, as well as the road leading to it. Nothing exists apart from the Principle of Heaven in Neo-Confucianism. The Way is contained within all things. Thus, the religious life is not an elite or special journey for Neo-Confucians. The normal, mundane life is the path that leads to the Absolute, because the Absolute is contained within the mundane objects and events of daily life.

Christian Interpretations

Noted Christian author C.S. Lewis used the word Tao to describe "the doctrine of objective value, the belief that certain attitudes are really true, and others really false, the kind of thing the Universe is and the kind of things we are." He asserted that every religion and philosophy contains foundations of universal ethics as an attempt to line up with the Tao—the way mankind was designed to be. In Lewis' thinking, God created the Tao and fully displayed it through the person of Jesus Christ.

In some Chinese translations of the New Testament,  (logos) is translated with the Chinese word dao (e.g. John 1:1), indicating that the translators considered the concept of Tao to be somewhat equivalent to logos in Greek philosophy and the Logos in Christianity.

Linguistic aspects 
The term dao  is analyzable in terms of Chinese characters, alternate dào "way" or dǎo "guide" pronunciations and meanings, a possible Proto-Indo-European etymology, and loanwords such as English Dao or dao.

Characters
Dao is written with the Chinese character  in both Traditional Chinese and Simplified Chinese. It typifies the most common Chinese character classification of "radical-phonetic" or "phono-semantic" graphs, which compound a "radical" or "signific" (roughly providing semantic information) with a "phonetic" (suggesting ancient pronunciation).

Dao  graphically combines the chuo  (or ) "go" radical and shou  "head" phonetic. Furthermore, dao  is the phonetic element in dao  "guide; lead" (with the cun  "thumb; hand" radical) and dao  "a tree name" (with the mu  "tree; wood" radical).

The traditional interpretation of the  character, dating back to the (121 CE) Shuowen Jiezi dictionary, was a rare huiyi  "compound ideogram" or "ideogrammic compound". The combination of chuo  "go" and shou  "head" (numbers 162 and 185 in the Kangxi radicals) signified a "head going" or "to lead the way".

Dao is graphically distinguished between its earliest nominal meaning of dao  "way; road; path;" and the later verbal sense of "say". It should also be contrasted with dao  "lead the way; guide; conduct; direct; ". The Simplified character  for dao  has si  "6th of the 12 Earthly Branches" in place of dao .

The earliest written forms of dao are bronzeware script and seal script characters from Zhou Dynasty (1045–256 BCE) bronzes and writings. These ancient dao characters more clearly depict the shou  "head" element as hair above a face. Some variants interchange the chuo  "go; advance" radical with the xing  "go; road" radical, with the original bronze "crossroads" depiction written in the seal character with two  and  "footprints".

Bronze scripts for dao  occasionally include an element of shou  "hand" or cun  "thumb; hand", which occurs in dao  "lead". The linguist Peter A. Boodberg explained,
This "tao with the hand element" is usually identified with the modern character  tao < d'ôg, "to lead," "guide," "conduct," and considered to be a derivative or verbal cognate of the noun tao, "way," "path." The evidence just summarized would indicate rather that "tao with the hand" is but a variant of the basic tao and that the word itself combined both nominal and verbal aspects of the etymon. This is supported by textual examples of the use of the primary tao in the verbal sense "to lead" (e. g., Analects 1.5; 2.8) and seriously undermines the unspoken assumption implied in the common translation of Tao as "way" that the concept is essentially a nominal one. Tao would seem, then, to be etymologically a more dynamic concept than we have made it translation-wise. It would be more appropriately rendered by "lead way" and "lode" ("way," "course," "journey," "leading," "guidance"; cf. "lodestone" and "lodestar"), the somewhat obsolescent deverbal noun from "to lead."
These Confucian Analects citations of dao verbally meaning "to guide; to lead" are: "The Master said, 'In guiding a state of a thousand chariots, approach your duties with reverence and be trustworthy in what you say" and "The Master said, 'Guide them by edicts, keep them in line with punishments, and the common people will stay out of trouble but will have no sense of shame."

Pronunciation
In Modern Standard Chinese, dao 's pronunciations are tonally differentiated between 4th falling tone dào "way; path" and 3rd dipping tone dǎo (usually written ) "guide; lead".

Besides these common 4th and 3rd tonal specifications dào  "way" and dǎo  (or ) "guide",  has a rare 1st level tone dāo pronunciation in the regional idiomatic expression shénshendāodāo  "odd; bizarre". This reduplication of shen  "spirit; god" and dao occurs in Northeast China speech.

Historical linguists have reconstructed Middle  "way" and  "guide" as d'âu- and d'âu: (Bernhard Karlgren), dau and dau daw' and dawh dawX and daws (William H. Baxter), and dâuB and dâuC.

In Old Chinese (ca. 7th–3rd centuries BCE) pronunciations, reconstructions for  "way" and  "guide" are *d'ôg (Karlgren), *dəw (Zhou), *dəgwx and *dəgwh, *luʔ, and *lûʔ and *lûh.

Meanings
The word dao  has many meanings. For example, the Chinese Hanyu Da Zidian  dictionary defines 39 meanings for dào  "way; path" and 6 for dǎo  "guide; lead".

John DeFrancis's Chinese-English dictionary gives twelve meanings for dào  "way; path; say", three for dǎo  (or ) "guide; lead", and one for dāo  in an "odd, bizarre" idiomatic expression. Note that brackets clarify abbreviations and ellipsis marks omitted usage examples.
2dào  N. [noun] road; path ◆M. [nominal measure word] ① (for rivers/topics/etc.) ② (for a course (of food); a streak (of light); etc.) ◆V. [verb] ① say; speak; talk (introducing direct quote, novel style) ... ② think; suppose ◆B.F. [bound form, bound morpheme] ① channel ② way; reason; principle ③ doctrine ④ Daoism ⑤ line ⑥〈hist.〉 [history] ⑦ district; circuit canal; passage; tube ⑧ say (polite words) ... See also 4dǎo, 4dāo

4dǎo  B.F. [bound form] ① guide; lead ... ② transmit; conduct ... ③ instruct; direct ...
4dāo  in shénshendāodāo ...  R.F. [reduplicated form] 〈topo.〉[non-Mandarin form] odd; fantastic; bizarre

Etymologies
The etymological linguistic origins of dao "way; path" depend upon its Old Chinese pronunciation, which scholars have tentatively reconstructed as *d'ôg, *dəgwx, *dəw, *luʔ, and *lûʔ.

Boodberg noted that the shou  "head" phonetic in the dao  character was not merely phonetic but "etymonic", analogous with English to head meaning "to lead" and "to tend in a certain direction," "ahead," "headway".
Paronomastically, tao is equated with its homonym  tao < d'ôg, "to trample," "tread," and from that point of view it is nothing more than a "treadway," "headtread," or "foretread "; it is also occasionally associated with a near synonym (and possible cognate)  ti < d'iôk, "follow a road," "go along," "lead," "direct"; "pursue the right path"; a term with definite ethical overtones and a graph with an exceedingly interesting phonetic,  yu < djôg," "to proceed from." The reappearance of C162 [] "walk" in ti with the support of C157 [] "foot" in tao, "to trample," "tread," should perhaps serve us as a warning not to overemphasize the headworking functions implied in tao in preference to those of the lower extremities.

Victor H. Mair proposes a connection with Proto-Indo-European drogh, supported by numerous cognates in Indo-European languages, as well as semantically similar Semitic Arabic and Hebrew words.
The archaic pronunciation of Tao sounded approximately like drog or dorg. This links it to the Proto-Indo-European root drogh (to run along) and Indo-European dhorg (way, movement). Related words in a few modern Indo-European languages are Russian doroga (way, road), Polish droga (way, road), Czech dráha (way, track), Serbo-Croatian draga (path through a valley), and Norwegian dialect drog (trail of animals; valley). .... The nearest Sanskrit (Old Indian) cognates to Tao (drog) are dhrajas (course, motion) and dhraj (course). The most closely related English words are "track" and "trek", while "trail" and "tract" are derived from other cognate Indo-European roots. Following the Way, then, is like going on a cosmic trek. Even more unexpected than the panoply of Indo-European cognates for Tao (drog) is the Hebrew root d-r-g for the same word and Arabic t-r-q, which yields words meaning "track, path, way, way of doing things" and is important in Islamic philosophical discourse.

Axel Schuessler's etymological dictionary presents two possibilities for the tonal morphology of dào  "road; way; method" < Middle Chinese dâuB < Old Chinese *lûʔ and dào  or  "to go along; bring along; conduct; explain; talk about" < Middle dâuC < Old *lûh. Either dào  "the thing which is doing the conducting" is a Tone B (shangsheng  "rising tone") "endoactive noun" derivation from dào  "conduct", or dào  is a Later Old Chinese (Warring States period) "general tone C" (qusheng  "departing tone") derivation from dào  "way". For a possible etymological connection, Schuessler notes the ancient Fangyan dictionary defines yu < *lokh  and lu < *lu  as Eastern Qi State dialectal words meaning dào < *lûʔ  "road".

Loanwords
Many languages have borrowed and adapted Chinese dao  "the way" as a loanword.

In Chinese, this character  is pronounced as Cantonese dou6 and Hokkian to7. In Sino-Xenic languages,  is pronounced as Japanese dō, tō, or michi; Korean do or to; and Vietnamese đạo, dạo, or nhạo.

Since 1982, when the International Organization for Standardization adopted Pinyin as the standard romanization of Chinese, many Western languages have changed from spelling this loanword tao in national systems (e.g., French EFEO Chinese transcription and English Wade–Giles) to dao in Pinyin.

The tao/dao "the way" English word of Chinese origin has three meanings, according to the Oxford English Dictionary.
1. a. In Taoism, an absolute entity which is the source of the universe; the way in which this absolute entity functions.
1. b. = Taoism, taoist
2. In Confucianism and in extended uses, the way to be followed, the right conduct; doctrine or method.
The earliest recorded usages were Tao (1736), Tau (1747), Taou (1831), and Dao (1971).

A derivative, Daoshi ("Daoist priest"), was used already by the Jesuits Matteo Ricci and Nicolas Trigault in their De Christiana expeditione apud Sinas, rendered as Tausu in the original Latin edition (1615), and Tausa in an early English translation published by Samuel Purchas (1625).

See also
 Daoism–Taoism romanization issue
 Dharma
 Brahma
 Logos
 Fard
 Rta
 God
 Absolute (philosophy)

Notes

References

Citations

Sources 

 
 
 
 
 
 
 
 

 
 
 
 

 

 

 
 

 

 
 
 
 

 
 
 
 
 {{cite book |last=Watts |first=Alan Wilson |title=Tao: The Watercourse Way with Al Chung-liang Huang |publisher=Pantheon |year=1977 |isbn=0-394-73311-8 }}
 
 
 

 Further reading 
Translation of the Tao te Ching by Derek Lin
老子 Lǎozĭ 道德經 Dàodéjīng Verbatim, Analogous, Poetic (Chinese, English, German)
Translation of the Dao de Jing by James Legge
Legge translation of the Tao Teh King at Project Gutenberg
Feng, Gia-Fu & Jane English (translators). 1972. Laozi/Dao De Jing. New York: Vintage Books.
Komjathy, Louis. Handbooks for Daoist Practice. 10 vols. Hong Kong: Yuen Yuen Institute, 2008.
Mitchell, Stephen (translator). 1988. Tao Te Ching: A New English Version. New York: Harper & Row.
Robinet, Isabelle. Taoism: Growth of a Religion (Stanford: Stanford University Press, 1997 [original French 1992]) page 14,20. .
 Sterckx, Roel. Chinese Thought. From Confucius to Cook Ding. London: Penguin, 2019.
Dao entry from Center for Daoist StudiesThe Tao of Physics'', Fritjof Capra, 1975

External links 
 
 
 

 
Classical Chinese philosophy
Concepts in aesthetics
Concepts in Chinese philosophy
Concepts in epistemology
Concepts in metaphilosophy
Concepts in metaphysics
Metaphysics of mind
Philosophical schools and traditions
Philosophy of life
Philosophy of religion